Fairfield–Vacaville Hannigan station is a train station in Fairfield, California, which provides rail access for the communities of Fairfield and Vacaville. The station is served by Amtrak California's Capitol Corridor rail line and FAST buses.

History
An environmental impact study was finalized in 2011. Ground was broken for construction on May 20, 2015. and was given an estimated completion date of March 2017. The entire projected was budgeted at $40 million, including parking, bus facilities, and the construction of an expanded overpass to carry Peabody Road over the railroad tracks.

Previously scheduled to be completed by August 2017 and incorporated into the Capitol Corridor schedule in October of that year, final testing delayed opening until a later date.  The station began service on November 13, 2017.

In May 2019, the stop was ceremonially named Fairfield–Vacaville Hannigan Station after former Fairfield Assemblymember Thomas M. Hannigan, who contributed to the development of the Capitol Corridor service.

References

External links

Fairfield–Vacaville – Capitol Corridor

Railway stations in Solano County, California
Amtrak stations in California
Fairfield, California
Vacaville, California
Railway stations in the United States opened in 2017
Public transportation in the San Francisco Bay Area